Palaeomicroides is a genus of small primitive metallic moths in the family Micropterigidae. The genus is endemic to Taiwan.

Species
There are seven recognized species:
Palaeomicroides aritai Hashimoto, 1996
Palaeomicroides caeruleimaculella Issiki, 1931 
Palaeomicroides costipunctella Issiki, 1931 
Palaeomicroides discopurpurella Issiki, 1931 
Palaeomicroides fasciatella Issiki, 1931 
Palaeomicroides marginella Issiki, 1931 
Palaeomicroides obscurella Issiki, 1931

References

Micropterigidae
Moth genera
Endemic fauna of Taiwan